The Wiseguys were a British electronic duo active in the mid to late 1990s. They produced the song "Start the Commotion", which was featured in a Mitsubishi TV advertisement, as well as the films The Lizzie McGuire Movie, Zoolander and Kangaroo Jack. Another of their singles, "Ooh La La", was used in the film Big Daddy and Budweiser commercials. Both tracks are from the duo's second album, The Antidote.

Career 
The band was formed in 1994 with two members, Touché (Theo Keating) and Regal (Paul Eve). They were music production partners from 1990 and released an EP called Ladies Say Ow! in 1994 on the Blackmarket International record label. The record label Wall of Sound signed the duo and released the double A-side "Nil by Mouth" / "Too Easy" in 1995. Their first album, Executive Suite was released in 1996 to critical acclaim, feature downtempo jazz beats and happy optimistic hip-hop numbers, and is now considered a cult classic.

Regal left the band in 1997 to pursue his career as co-founder of the UK's Bronx Dogs, and Touché worked on the second Wiseguys album, The Antidote. This was released in 1998, and contained their two most well-known songs, "Ooh La La" and "Start the Commotion". "Ooh La La" was a minor UK hit in April 1998, but in March 1999 it was re-released as a single and went to No. 2 in the UK Singles Chart following its use in a popular TV commercial for Budweiser. In 2001, "Start the Commotion" was shown on a Mitsubishi Motors television commercial in the United States, and the song reached the top 40 of the Billboard Hot 100.

Solo work
The Wiseguys disbanded in 2001, and Touché worked solo producing house music under Fatboy Slim's Southern Fried record label. In July 2006, Regal released his first solo single "Shock Ya Mind" on the Funk Weapons label.

On 31 December 2006, Executive Suite made its way onto the US version of iTunes. Touché is a producer and DJ, one half of the Black Ghosts. He produces under several other aliases including Fake Blood.

Regal signed to Unique Records in 2007 and has since released two solo albums and three singles for the label, including his debut solo album Loop Dreams and his latest CD Time Past, which is paired with his "Time Past" 12" remixes sampler, released in late 2009.

Discography

Albums

EPs
Ladies Say Ow! (1994)

Compilation appearances
Wall of Sound Essentials – Mixed by the Wiseguys (2000)

Singles

The Japanese version of The Antidote contains a bonus track, "Expand on the Topic" which features guest spots from J-Nise, Season and Sense Live, and was the B-side to the "Ooh La La" single.

References

External links
 

English electronic music duos
English hip hop groups
Big beat groups
Musical groups established in 1994
Musical groups disestablished in 2001
Trip hop groups